The L.D. Hutchinson House is a historic house on the east side of Arkansas Highway 31 in the small community of Floyd, Arkansas, a short way north of its junction with Arkansas Highway 305.  The house is a  story wood-frame structure, with a side gable roof and novelty siding.  A single-story shed-roof porch extends across the west-facing front, supported by turned posts with decorative wooden bracket at the top.  A single gabled dormer projects from the center of the roof, and an ell extends to the rear of the house, giving it a T shape.  The house was built in 1914 by L.D. Hutchinson, a local farmer who also operated the local general store and post office.

The house was listed on the National Register of Historic Places in 1992.

See also
National Register of Historic Places listings in White County, Arkansas

References

Houses on the National Register of Historic Places in Arkansas
Houses completed in 1914
Houses in White County, Arkansas
National Register of Historic Places in White County, Arkansas